Guinea is a country on the coast of West Africa and is bordered by Guinea-Bissau, Senegal, Mali, Ivory Coast, Liberia, and Sierra Leone.

Guinea is divided into four geographic regions: Maritime Guinea (Lower Guinea) a coastal plain running north to south behind the coast; the pastoral Fouta Djallon highlands (Middle Guinea); the northern savanna (Upper Guinea); and a southeastern rain-forest region (Forest Guinea).

Location
Guinea is in western Africa, bordering the North Atlantic Ocean, between Guinea-Bissau and Sierra Leone. Guinea's total area is 245,857 km2, comprising 245,717 km2 of land and 140 km2 of water.

Guinea's land boundaries span a total of 4,046 km: with Ivory Coast 816 km, Guinea-Bissau 421 km, Liberia 590 km, Mali 1,062 km, Senegal 363 km, and Sierra Leone 794 km.

Climate

The coastal region of Guinea and most of the inland have a tropical climate, with a monsoonal-type rainy season lasting from April to November, relatively high and uniform temperatures, southwesterly winds, and high humidity.

Conakry's average annual rainfall is almost . Sahelian Upper Guinea has a shorter rainy season and greater daily temperature variations. There is a dry season (December to May) with northeasterly harmattan winds.

Rivers and water 

The Niger River, the Gambia River, and the Senegal River are among the 22 West African rivers that have their origins in Guinea.

Ecoregions
 Guinean forest-savanna mosaic covers most of the country, covering most of Maritime Guinea and Upper Guinea, as well as the lower elevations of the Fouta Djallon. It extends north into Guinea Bissau and Senegal, and east through Mali and Ivory Coast.
 Western Guinean lowland forests occupies the southwestern portion of Maritime Guinea around Conakry, and Forest Guinea, along with coastal Sierra Leone, Liberia, and western Ivory Coast.
 Guinean montane forests, cover the Fouta Djallon and Guinea Highlands of southeast Guinea above an elevation of 600 meters.
 Guinean mangroves, in the coastal estuaries. Enclaves extend north into Guinea Bissau, Gambia and Senegal, and southeast through Sierra Leone, Liberia, and Ivory Coast.

Resources and environment

The country's natural resources include bauxite, iron ore, diamonds, gold, uranium, hydropower, fish, and salt. It has 12.21% arable land, and 2.85% of the land is permanent crops. 949.2 km2 (2003) of land is irrigated. Guinea's total renewable water resources total 226 km3.

Environmental issues 
Current environmental issues in Guinea include: deforestation; inadequate supplies of potable water; desertification; soil contamination and erosion; and overfishing and overpopulation in forest regions.  Poor mining practices have led to environmental damage.

Guinea is party to the following international environmental agreements: Biodiversity, Desertification, Endangered Species, Hazardous Wastes, Law of the Sea, Ozone Layer Protection, Ship Pollution, Wetlands, Whaling.

Terrain 

Its terrain is generally flat coastal plain, hilly to mountainous interior. The country's lowest point is the Atlantic Ocean (0 m), and highest is Mont Nimba (1,752 m).

A recent global remote sensing analysis suggested that there were 549km² of tidal flats in Guinea, making it the 47th ranked country in terms of tidal flat area.

This is a list of the extreme points of Guinea, the points that are farther north, south, east or west than any other location.

 Northernmost point – the northern section of the border with Senegal, Boké Region*.
 Easternmost point – the confluence of the Gben river and the Férédougouba river on the border with Ivory Coast, Nzérékoré Region.
 Southernmost point – unnamed location on the border with Liberia immediately south of the village of Gonon, Nzérékoré Region.
 Westernmost point –  Ile du Noufrage, Boké Region.
 Westernmost point (mainland) – the point at which the border with Guinea-Bissau enters the Rio Compony estuary.
 *Note: Guinea does not have a northernmost point, this section of the border being formed by a straight latitudinal line

See also 
 Administrative divisions of Guinea

References